In computer graphics, a T-spline is a mathematical model for defining freeform surfaces. A T-spline surface is a type of surface defined by a network of control points where a row of control points is allowed to terminate without traversing the entire surface. The control net at a terminated row resembles the letter "T". 

Modeling surfaces with T-splines can reduce the number of control points in comparison to NURBS surfaces and make pieces easier to merge, but increases the book-keeping effort to keep track of the irregular connectivity. T-splines can be converted into NURBS surfaces, by knot insertion, and NURBS can be represented as T-splines without T's or by removing knots. T-splines can therefore, in theory, do everything that NURBS can do. In practice, an enormous amount of programming was required to make NURBS work as well as they do, and creating the equivalent T-spline functionality would require similar effort. To smoothly join at points where more than three surface pieces meet, T-splines have been combined with geometrically continuous constructions of degree 3 by 3 (bi-cubic) and, more recently, of degree 4 by 4 (bi-quartic).

Subdivision surfaces, NURBS surfaces, and polygon meshes are alternative technologies. Subdivision surfaces, as well as T-spline and NURBS surfaces with the addition of geometrically continuous constructions, can represent everywhere-smooth surfaces of any connectivity and topology, such as holes, branches, and handles. However, none of T-splines, subdivision surfaces, or NURBS surfaces can always accurately represent the (exact, algebraic) intersection of two surfaces within the same surface representation. Polygon meshes can represent exact intersections but lack the shape quality required in industrial design. Subdivision surfaces are widely adopted in the animation industry.  Pixar's variant of the subdivision surfaces has the advantage of edge weights. T-splines do not yet have edge weights.

T-splines were initially defined in 2003.  In 2007 the U.S. patent office granted patent number 7,274,364 for technologies related to T-Splines. T-Splines, Inc. was founded in 2004 to commercialize the technologies and acquired by Autodesk, Inc. in 2011.

External links 
 Technical articles about T-splines
 Transitioning from NURBS to T-splines (67-minute video)
 NURBS and CAD: 30 Years Together
 An open source T-spline kernel

References 

Computer-aided design
Splines (mathematics)